Scialatelli  (also known as scialatielli , sciliatielli  and scivatieddi ) is a short, thick pasta with a rectangular cross section and an almost straight but slightly irregular, slightly curvy shape. It is typical of modern Campanian cuisine, having originated on the Amalfi coast as a chef's specialty, but it has also spread in nearby regions such as Calabria and Basilicata (respectively, in the area of Catanzaro and Potenza).

History
Scialatelli is a recent innovation, compared to many other Italian pasta shapes. The Italian chef Enrico Cosentino devised the shape in the late 1960s in his native Amalfi, while working in a local restaurant, and it gained recognition in 1978, when he won the Entremétier prize in an international culinary contest.

Etymology
Scialatiello (singular for scialatielli) may come from Neapolitan scigliatiello or sciliatiello, a derivative of the verb sciglià ("to ruffle"), and it roughly translates to "ruffled": scialatelli look like "ruffled" strips of pasta when set in a dish, as each strip has a slightly irregular shape after being hand-made and plainly cut by a kitchen knife. Another theory about this pasta name is that it comes from Neapolitan scialà ("to enjoy") and tiella ("pan"), though it rather sounds like a folk etymology resulted from a linguistic corruption of the original word.

Notes

References

Cuisine of Campania
Types of pasta